Gressoney-La-Trinité (Gressoney  or) is a town or commune and renowned alpine resort at the foot of Monte Rosa in the Val de Gressoney, which is part of the Aosta Valley region of Northwest Italy. It features one of the most scenic alpine ski resorts in the Aosta Valley.

Geography
Gressoney-La-Trinité is located in a side valley of the Aosta Valley region of northwestern Italy. At 1,627 metres (5,338 ft) above sea level, it has the highest elevation of any city in the Gressoney Valley.

History
 

Germanic people, known as the Walser, settled in the upper Lys Valley from the 12th century onwards. Historically, Gressoney-Saint-Jean and Gressoney-La-Trinité have been two separate communes.

From 1928 until 1946, the two communes were unified and officially named Gressoney. From 1939 to 1946, the name was Italianized into Gressonei. After WWII the two former communes were again reconstituted separately.

Walser Culture and Language 
Gressoney-La-Trinité and Gressoney-Saint-Jean form a Walser German linguistic and cultural entity known as Greschòney in Franco-Provençal or Arpitan, Kressenau in Walser German, or Kreschnau in the local Walser dialect known as Greschoneytitsch (or simply Titsch).

An example of Greschòneytitsch:

Where to stay 
There are many hotels and bed-and-breakfast lodgings near the Monterosa ski lifts. Camping chalets and pitches are also available for rent.

References

External links
 Official tourism information for Gressoney
 Official tourist information for the Aosta Valley

Cities and towns in Aosta Valley
Ski areas and resorts in Italy